A polonaise) is a stately dance of Polish origin or a piece of music for this dance.

Polonaise may also refer to:

 Polonaises (Chopin), compositions by Frédéric Chopin
 Polonaise in A-flat major, Op. 53 (Heroic Polonaise)
 Polonaise (clothing), a woman's garment popular in late-18th-century Europe
 Polonaise (film) (or Leedvermaak), a 1989 Dutch drama film directed by Frans Weisz
 Polonaise (sauce), a garnish made of melted butter, breadcrumbs and herbs
 Polonaise (vodka), a Polish brand of vodka
 Polonaise nightclub in Manhattan, Caesar (cocktail) origin
 Lit à la polonaise, a type of richly decorated canopy bed

Polonez 
 Polonez (multiple rocket launcher), Belarusian 300 mm rocket artillery system
 Polonez Cove, a headland in the South Shetland Islands, Antarctica
 Polonez Cup, a Baltic Sea yachting regatta
 FSO Polonez, a Polish automobile brand

See also
 
 
 Polonezköy, a neighborhood of Istanbul, Turkey
 Polonezköy Nature Park
 Polonozercon, a genus of mites in the family Zerconidae
 Polonization, acquisition or imposition of elements of Polish culture